John James "Cap" McEwan (February 18, 1893 – August 9, 1970) was an American football player and coach.  He played from 1913 to 1916 as a center at the United States Military Academy, where he was a three-time All-American and captain of the Army football squad for three seasons.  McEwan served as the head football coach at West Point (1923–1925), the University of Oregon (1926–1929), and the College of the Holy Cross (1930–1932), compiling a career college football record of 59–23–6.  He also coached at the professional level for the Brooklyn Dodgers of the National Football League (NFL) from 1933 to 1934, tallying a mark of 9–11–1.  McEwan was inducted into the College Football Hall of Fame as a player in 1962.

Coaching career
From 1923 to 1925 McEwan led Army to an 18–5–3 record. All three of his seasons there were winning seasons. From 1926 to 1929 he took over as the head football coach at Oregon. His record there stands at 20–13–2, with his 1928 team completing a 9–2 campaign.

Head coaching record

College

Notes

References

External links
 
 

1893 births
1970 deaths
American football centers
Army Black Knights football coaches
Army Black Knights football players
Brooklyn Dodgers (NFL) coaches
Holy Cross Crusaders football coaches
Oregon Ducks football coaches
All-American college football players
College Football Hall of Fame inductees
United States Army officers
People from Alexandria, Minnesota
Coaches of American football from Minnesota
Players of American football from Minnesota
Military personnel from Minnesota